Nip and tuck may refer to:

 Nip and tuck (cosmetic surgery), a colloquialism for rhytidectomy, a cosmetic surgery to smooth facial wrinkles
 Nip and Tuck, Kentucky, the former name of Artemus, Kentucky
 Nip/Tuck (2003–2010), an American television drama series created by Ryan Murphy
 Twin girls in the 1934 film Girl o' My Dreams
 The former name of Harmony Hill, Texas

See also
 Touch and Go (disambiguation)